In algebraic geometry, a noetherian scheme is a scheme that admits a finite covering by open affine subsets ,  noetherian rings. More generally, a scheme is locally noetherian if it is covered by spectra of noetherian rings. Thus, a scheme is noetherian if and only if it is locally noetherian and quasi-compact.  As with noetherian rings, the concept is named after Emmy Noether.

It can be shown that, in a locally noetherian scheme, if   is an open affine subset, then A is a noetherian ring. In particular,  is a noetherian scheme if and only if A is a noetherian ring. Let X be a locally noetherian scheme. Then the local rings  are noetherian rings.

A noetherian scheme is a noetherian topological space. But the converse is false in general; consider, for example, the spectrum of a non-noetherian valuation ring.

The definitions extend to formal schemes.

Properties and Noetherian hypotheses 
Having a (locally) Noetherian hypothesis for a statement about schemes generally makes a lot of problems more accessible because they sufficiently rigidify many of its properties.

Dévissage 
One of the most important structure theorems about Noetherian rings and Noetherian schemes is the Dévissage theorem. This theorem makes it possible to decompose arguments about coherent sheaves into inductive arguments. It is because given a short exact sequence of coherent sheavesproving one of the sheaves has some property is equivalent to proving the other two have the property. Since this process can only be applied a finite number of times in a non-trivial manner, this makes many induction arguments possible.

Number of irreducible components 
Every Noetherian scheme can only have finitely many components.

Morphisms from Noetherian schemes are quasi-compact 
Every morphism from a Noetherian scheme  is quasi-compact.

Homological properties 
There are many nice homological properties of Noetherian schemes.

Cech and sheaf cohomology 
Cech cohomology and sheaf cohomology agree on an affine open cover. This makes it possible to compute the sheaf cohomology of  using Cech cohomology for the standard open cover.

Compatibility of colimits with cohomology 
Given a direct system  of sheaves of abelian groups on a Noetherian scheme, there is a canonical isomorphismmeaning the functorspreserve direct limits and coproducts.

Derived direct image 

Examples 
Many of the schemes found in the wild are Noetherian schemes.

Locally of finite type over a Noetherian base 
This includes many examples, such as the connected components of a Hilbert scheme, i.e. with a fixed Hilbert polynomial. This is important because it implies many moduli spaces encountered in the wild are Noetherian, such as the Moduli of algebraic curves and Moduli of stable vector bundles. Also, this property can be used to show many schemes considered in algebraic geometry are in fact Noetherian.

Quasi-projective varieties 
In particular, quasi-projective varieties are Noetherian schemes. This class includes algebraic curves, elliptic curves, abelian varieties, calabi-yau schemes, shimura varieties, K3 surfaces, and cubic surfaces. Basically all of the objects from classical algebraic geometry fit into this class of examples.

Infinitesimal deformations of Noetherian schemes 
In particular, infinitesimal deformations of Noetherian schemes are again Noetherian. For example, given a curve , any deformation  is also a Noetherian scheme. A tower of such deformations can be used to construct formal Noetherian schemes.

Non-examples

Schemes over Adelic bases 
One of the natural rings which are non-Noetherian are the Ring of adeles  for an algebraic number field . In order to deal with such rings, a topology is considered, giving topological rings. There is a notion of algebraic geometry over such rings developed by Weil and Alexander Grothendieck.

Rings of integers over infinite extensions 
This breaks the intuition that finite dimensional schemes are necessarily Noetherian. Also, this example provides motivation for why studying schemes over a non-Noetherian base; that is, schemes , can be an interesting and fruitful subject.

One special casepg 93 of such an extension is taking the maximal unramified extension  and considering the ring of integers .

Polynomial ring with infinitely many generators 
Another example of a non-Noetherian finite-dimensional scheme (in fact zero-dimensional) is given by the following quotient of a polynomial ring with infinitely many generators.

See also 

 Excellent ring - slightly more rigid than Noetherian rings, but has better properties
 Chevalley's theorem on constructible sets
 Zariski's main theorem
 Dualizing complex
 Nagata's compactification theorem

References 

 
 
Algebraic geometry